Treasury Varieties was an American syndicated weekly 30-minute radio program that aired on the Mutual network from 1948 to 1953.  The program was sponsored by the U.S. Treasury Department to promote the sale of U.S. Savings Bonds.  The show featured the music of entertainers backed by a studio orchestra, notably Henry Jerome and His Orchestra, who, over the life of the program, had the longest run.  Frank H. Walldecker (1909–1995) was the announcer.  Regulars with the Jerome Orchestra included Hal Burton (singer), Morrie Allen (singer), Joe Grimm (Joe Grimaldi) (singer), the Glee Club, and the Three Jays.

Other entertainers (1949) included Bob Chester and His Orchestra, featuring Bobby Breen (singer).

Extant recordings of radio broadcasts 
 63035: May 28, 1948, Mutual
 "The Third Man Theme," Frank H. Waldecker (1909–1995) (announcer), Hal Barton (vocal), Joe Grimm (Joe Grimaldi) (vocal), Maurie Allen (vocal), The Three Jays. 29:50

 2313: January 21, 1950,  Mutual
 Larry Fotine and His Orchestra, Johnny Goodfellow (vocal)

 Note:  The indexing is that of J. David Goldin (born 1942) , Newtown, Connecticut: RadioGOLDINdex,
 Note:  Marr Sound Archives

References 

1940s American radio programs
1950s American radio programs
American music radio programs
American variety radio programs
Mutual Broadcasting System programs